Chițcani may refer to several places in Moldova:
Chițcani, a commune in Căușeni district
Chițcanii Vechi, a commune in Telenești district, and its village of Chițcanii Noi

and to several places in Romania:
Chițcani, a village in Costești Commune, Vaslui County
Chițcani, a village in Boghești Commune, Vrancea County